Bromelia lagopus is a plant species in the genus Bromelia. This species is native to Brazil.

References

lagopus
Flora of Brazil